Iravukku Aayiram Kangal is a 2018 Indian Tamil-language action thriller film directed by Mu. Maran. The film features an ensemble cast including Arulnithi, Ajmal, Mahima Nambiar, Vidya Pradeep, Chaya Singh, and Suja Varunee, while Anandaraj, John Vijay, Lakshmy Ramakrishnan, and Aadukalam Naren play supporting roles. Sam CS composed the soundtrack. Axess Film Factory began production in March 2017. It was released in May 2018 and received good response from critics.

Plot 
Bharath (Arulnithi) is a taxi driver who is in love with Suseela (Mahima Nambiar), a nurse. He is a fan of writer Vyjayanthi (Lakshmy Ramakrishnan). Once, she rides in his taxi and notices a man and his bike. She tells Bharath that her late husband had the same bike and died, so she is investigating his death. One evening, when Suseela returns from a wedding in a cab, the driver misbehaves with her. Ganesh (Ajmal) saves her, and she thanks him. When they meet again, Ganesh tries to pursue her inappropriately. Ganesh also finds that Suseela is in love with Bharath and warns her to cut off all ties with him. Suseela then meets Bharath and tells him about the problems that Ganesh created, but they find her client Roopala (Chaya Singh) trying to drown herself. They save her, and she tells about her problems with her abusive husband, Vasanth (John Vijay). Also, she inadvertently connected with Ganesh, who films her nude and blackmails her for money. Bharath notices that Ganesh owns the bike that Vyjayanthi had mentioned. Meanwhile, retired businessman Murugesan (Anandaraj) loses money and jewels because of Ganesh.

It is revealed that Ganesh is actually a conman who operates with Anitha (Vidya Pradeep) and Maya (Suja Varunee), and they cheat wealthy people and extort money from them. Murugesan follows Ganesh and finds his address with Narain's (Aadukalam Naren) help. Bharath also finds Ganesh's address and follows him to his house. A neighbor reports the men loitering near the house to the police. When the police arrives to investigate, they learn that Maya is murdered. Bharath is identified as a suspect. He assumes that Murugesan is the killer, but the latter reveals that she was dead before he went into the house. Murugesan also accidentally picked up the murder weapon in a panicked state and left his own gun there. Narain also reveals that he was a victim of Ganesh. Maya had befriended him online, and they were in a relationship when Ganesh threatened both of them at gunpoint and stole Narain's money and car, but the police found the car and returned it to Narain. Narain had been thinking that Maya disappeared from his life, but he saw her with Ganesh. Unable to bear Maya's betrayal, Narain goes to her house to kill her, but he found her dead.

Later, Bharath finds that Vasanth had an affair with Anitha. Ganesh filmed them together and blackmailed him for money. When Vasanth finds that Anitha was part of the scam, Ganesh beats him up. Ganesh blackmails Vasanth about his video with Anitha, but Vasanth does not care. Then, Ganesh blackmails Vasanth with Roopala's nude video, and he gives money. Bharath follows Vasanth, and a fight ensues where the latter kills Anitha and Ganesh. Bharath tells Vasanth that the entire plan to extort money from him was made by Roopala. She wanted to separate from Vasanth and get money from him, so she approached Anitha and Ganesh to help her make a video of Vasanth to blackmail him, and she would then pay them. Ganesh wanted to take the money for himself, so he and Anitha made a nude video of Roopala. Suddenly, Ganesh and Anitha plan to join together and leave Maya out. Maya learns of this, and when she threatens them, Ganesh kills her. Roopala and Vasanth are arrested, and Bharath marries Suseela.

A major twist arrives in the form of Vyjayanthi, who has been following Maya's murder. She calls Bharath, requesting his permission to write a book based on this event. Vyjayanthi narrates a changed plot where Ganesh films Suseela nude and threatens her to marry him. When Bharath discovers this and Roopala's video, he decides to confront Ganesh and erase both videos. Maya learns that Ganesh is after Suseela, so she threatens him to split the shares. If he does not, she will tell Anitha about Suseela. When Bharath and Suseela go to Ganesh's house to retrieve the videos, Maya tries to attack Bharath, but Suseela kills her. Bharath and Suseela erase the videos and leave the crime scene. Bharath finds that Murugesan had taken the murder weapon, so he plants it in Ganesh's car and frames him for Maya's murder.

In the present, Bharath requests Vyjayanthi to find an alternative plot. Later, when he visits her, he finds her murdered, implying that her version of the story may be true. It is left to the audience as to who is Vyjayanthi's murderer.

Cast

Production 
Mu. Maran, an erstwhile assistant director to Raghava Lawrence and K. V. Anand, announced in February 2017 that his first directorial venture would be a crime thriller featuring Arulnithi. Titled Iravukku Aayiram Kangal after a song from Kulamagal Radhai (1963), Maran revealed that the film was based on real life incidents which he had read about in newspapers. While Arulnithi would portray a taxi driver, actress Mahima Nambiar was signed to play a nurse, after the director was impressed with her performance in Kuttram 23 (2017). Actors Ajmal and Anandaraj also signed the project in March 2017, with filming starting during the month. Initially, Vishal Chandrasekhar was selected as music composer for this film as depicted on the teaser of the film. But in a turn of events, Sam CS replaces Vishal as the music director.

Soundtrack 
The songs and background score were handled by Sam CS, and the lyrics were written by the composer himself. The soundtrack consisted of three tracks and two themes having five songs in total, which received positive reviews from the critics praising the usage of new sounds and the tracks that suited the respective situations of the movie.

Release 
The production cost of the film was valued at 6 crore. The satellite rights of the film were sold to Sun TV (India). The movie received positive to mixed reviews from critics praising the story, screenplay and the performances of the cast. Thinkal Menon from The Times Of India rated the movie 3.5 out of 5 and wrote, "The major attraction of the film is its two hours duration and its racy screenplay."

References

External links

2018 films
2010s Tamil-language films
Indian action thriller films
Indian films based on actual events
Films scored by Vishal Chandrasekhar
2018 directorial debut films
2018 action thriller films
Films scored by Sam C. S.